Zullo  is a surname. Notable people with the surname include: 

Albertine Zullo (born 1967), Swiss illustrator
Allan Zullo, American author
Chrissie Zullo, Canadian comic book artist 
Frank Zullo (1932–2018), American politician from Connecticut
Lindsay Zullo (born 1991), Haitian footballer
Michael Zullo (born 1988), Australian footballer